Until 1992 the Slovak Republic had been united with the Czech Republic as the nation of Czechoslovakia. 
Following World War II, a U.S. consulate was established in Bratislava, but the consulate was closed on May 27, 1950, on the order of the Czechoslovak government, at the height of the Cold War. In 1990 the consulate was reestablished in Bratislava. The Consulate was upgraded to the status of Consulate General on October 21, 1991. In June 1992, the Slovak parliament voted to declare sovereignty and the Czech-Slovak federation dissolved peacefully on January 1, 1993. The United States recognized the Slovak Republic as an independent state and established diplomatic relations with it on January 1, 1993. The embassy in Bratislava was established January 4, 1993, with Paul Hacker as Chargé d’Affaires ad interim. He was replaced by Eleanor Sutter on July 7, 1993. The first ambassador, Theodore E. Russell was commissioned to Slovakia on November 22, 1993. The United States has maintained diplomatic relations with Slovakia since 1993.

Ambassadors

Notes

See also
Slovakia – United States relations
Foreign relations of Slovakia
Ambassadors of the United States

References
United States Department of State: Background notes on Slovakia

External links
 United States Department of State: Chiefs of Mission for Slovakia
 United States Department of State: Slovakia
 United States Embassy in Bratislava

Slovakia

United States